The Scandinavian Scientist Conferences (Nordiske Naturforskermøde/Nordiska Naturforskarmöte a.k.a. Naturforskerselskabet/Naturforskarsällskapet or Scandinavian Association of Naturalists) was a series of meetings 1839-1936 for scientists and physicists from Denmark, Norway and Sweden, later also Finland and Iceland, in the era Scandinavism. The scientific community in Scandinavia were small and scattered, but collectively they had by the 1830s attained the critical mass for meeting at conferences. The inspiration came from Germany, where the scientists since 1822 had held conferences to improve communication in the fragmented geopolitical landscape. The creation of the British Association for the Advancement of Science (1831) drew on the same source of inspiration.
From the start, the Scandinavian Scientist Conferences became an outlet for important scientific results. However, towards the end of the 19th century, uni-disciplinary conferences and scientific journals became competitors to the Scandinavian conference as vehicle for scientific communication. As the presentations given at the Scandinavian conferences increasingly were summaries of results already published elsewhere, the meetings lost their importance.
The early meetings were held every second year, then every third year, and then at increasingly irregular intervals. In the 20th century, only four Scandinavian Scientist Conferences were held, the last in Helsinki 1936.

Notes

References
Eriksson, Nils (1991) "I andans kraft, på sannings stråt": De skandinaviska naturforskarmötena 1839-1936. Gothenburg studies in the history of science and ideas 12, 512 pp. 

Science conferences
Scandinavia